The New Canaan Nature Center is a botanical garden, arboretum and nature preserve located at 144 Oenoke Ridge, Route 124, about  north of the center of New Canaan, Connecticut.

The nature center includes wet and dry meadows, two ponds, wet and dry woodlands, dense thickets, an old orchard, and a cattail marsh, as well as a  greenhouse. Landscaped areas of the site include a wildflower garden (which won the 1997 Homer Lucas Landscape Award from the New England Wild Flower Society), a herb garden and a perennial border. About 90% of the plant specimens in the wildflower garden are native species, including bloodroot, columbine, mayapple, jack-in-the-pulpit, wild geranium, Solomon's plume, starflower, and trillium. Shade-loving perennials include bleeding heart, crested iris, Jacob's ladder, hepatica, European ginger and Virginia bluebells. Azaleas, rhododendrons and a stand of mountain laurel also feature.

The center also contains a small arboretum of Sciadopitys verticillata (Umbrella Pine), Chamaecyparis pisifera Squarrosa (Moss Sawara Cypress), Chamaecyparis pisifera Plumosa (Plume False Cyprus), Pinus densiflora ‘Umbraculifera’ (Japanese Umbrella Pine), Fagus sylvatica ‘Atropunicea’ (Purple Beech), Fagus sylvatica ‘Pendula’ (European Weeping Beech), Cercis canandensis (Eastern Redbud), Acer palmatum ‘Dissectum-Pendula’, Pinus cembra (Swiss Stone Pine) and Picea apies ‘Repens’ (Weeping Norway Spruce).

New Canaan Nature Center features many nature programs throughout the year, including the Fall Fair every October, and maple sugaring celebrations in early spring.

See also 
 List of botanical gardens in the United States
 List of nature centers in the United States

References

External links 
 New Canaan Nature Center Homepage

Buildings and structures in New Canaan, Connecticut
Tourist attractions in Fairfield County, Connecticut
Nature centers in Connecticut
Botanical gardens in Connecticut
Arboreta in Connecticut
Protected areas of Fairfield County, Connecticut
Protected areas established in 1960
Education in Fairfield County, Connecticut